Vilva may refer to several places in Russia:
Vilva (river), a river in Perm Krai
Vilva, Gornozavodsky District, a settlement in Gornozavodsky District
Vilva, Dobryansky District, a settlement in Dobryansky District